The Winning Girl is a lost 1919 silent film comedy drama directed by Robert G. Vignola and starring Shirley Mason.

Cast
Shirley Mason - Jemmy Milligan
Theodore Roberts - Major Milligan
Harold Goodwin - Jack Milligan
Lincoln Stedman - Percy Milligan  (*billed Lincoln Steadman)
Clara Horton - Vivian Milligan
Jean Calhoun - Gwendolyn Milligan
Edythe Chapman - 2nd Mrs. Milligan
Niles Welch - Stanley Templeton
Helen Dunbar - Mrs. Templeton
Jose Melville - Fanny Milligan

References

External links
 

1919 films
American silent feature films
Lost American films
Films directed by Robert G. Vignola
Paramount Pictures films
American black-and-white films
1910s English-language films
1919 comedy-drama films
1919 lost films
Lost comedy-drama films
1910s American films
Silent American comedy-drama films